Ann Evers (September 6, 1915 – June 4, 1987) was an American film actress.  She played the female lead in several B westerns, but largely appeared in supporting roles. She was married to the screenwriter Seton I. Miller.

Selected filmography
 Too Many Parents (1936)
 Hollywood Boulevard (1936)
 Forgotten Faces (1936)
 Anything for a Thrill (1937)
 Frontier Town (1938)
 Riders of the Black Hills (1938)
 The Mad Miss Manton (1938)
 Hawk of the Wilderness (1938)
 If I Were King (1938)
 Next Time I Marry (1938)
 Beauty for the Asking (1939)
 Police Bullets (1942)
 She Has What It Takes (1943)
 Casanova Brown (1944)

References

Bibliography
 Langman, Larry & Finn, Daniel. A Guide to American Crime Films of the Thirties. Greenwood Press, 1995.
 Oduka, Ted. Grand National, Producers Releasing Corporation, and Screen Guild/Lippert: Complete Filmographies with Studio Histories. McFarland & Company, 1989.
 Rothel, David. The Singing Cowboys. A.S. Barnes, 1978.

External links

1915 births
1987 deaths
American film actresses
People from Scranton, Pennsylvania